Kumarakom is a popular tourism destination located near the city of Kottayam, in Kerala, India, famous for its backwater tourism. It is set in the backdrop of the Vembanad Lake, the largest lake in the state of Kerala. In January 2023, when Kerala was chosen by the New York Times as one among the 52 must-see tourist destinations in the world, Kumarakom got a special mention for its backwater tourism.

History

Kumarakom was within the jurisdiction of the king of Thekkumkur while that kingdom existed, and it was usual to have fighting and competitions among local kings. Small boats called Chundan Vallam and Kettu Vallam were widely used among the local kings for their lightning attacks and fighting in central Travancore. During those days Vembanad Lake was a dangerous area; therefore the king of Thekkumcore kept soldiers in Kumarakom and constructed a fort at the entrance of Kottathodu in Kumarakom.

Soldiers were kept in certain areas of Kumarakom for protection against enemy attacks; some of those places still have "pada" (meaning war) in their names, such as Padakkalam and Padanilam. The remains of the fort's wall, six feet broad, can still be seen near the village office of Kumarakom.

Environment
Kumarakom is home to a wide variety of flora and fauna. Kumarakom Bird Sanctuary is a noted bird sanctuary where many species of migratory birds visit. The Vembanad Lake, the largest backwater in Kerala, is habitat for many marine and freshwater fish species and it teems with Karimeen (Pearl spot also known as Etroplus suratensis) shrimp (Metapenaeus dobsonii) common name Poovalan chemeen. The bird sanctuary extends over 14 acres (57,000 m2), and came into existence following preservation efforts from the government. It is a major tourist attraction.

Climate
Kumarakom has a moderate climate throughout the year. It is a balanced tropical climate, which has two monsoons south west and north east. Some times heavy rain and some times summer

Economy
Fishing, agriculture  and tourism are the major economic activities.  Kumarakom's perfectly balanced tropical climate is very conducive to cultivation. The place has expanses of mangrove forests, paddy fields and coconut groves. Fruits like Banana, Mango, Jackfruit, Ambazhanga, Puli (Tamarind), Chaambenga, Peraycka (Guava), Aathaycka and Pineapple grow here. Also, cocoa and coffee, chena(yam) and chembu (colocasia), grow well and were cultivated under the coconut trees. This rich agricultural environment is mainly irrigated using interspersed waterways and canals of the Meenachil river. The smaller canals are often lined by hibiscus plants which lean partly over the canals to form a green canopy, from which hang the lovely hibiscus flowers.

In the olden days, when the bund separating the backwaters from the sea was not yet built, the water in the canals moved in and out with the sea tide and it was salty. 
After the Thanneermukkam bund was constructed, the connection to the open sea was not free anymore, and so the tidal movement of the water in the canals stopped. 
It stagnated and then plenty of water hyacinths started growing densely in the canals, forming lovely green carpets with pale lilac flowers carpets.

Religion
Main religions are Hinduism and Christianity, More than 70% of people belong to Ezhava caste under four SNDP of Sree Kumaramangalam Temple, and the rest of the people belong to Christian religion The famous church in Kumarakom is Attamangalam St John the Baptist church. The people of Kumarakom celebrate both the festivals of Temples and Churches equally without the discrimination of caste and religions.

Fishing
Fishing is mainly done using the small boats (vallams) and gill nets (gear). The main catches are black clam (Villorita cyprinoides), Karimeen (Pearl spot also known as Etroplus suratensis) and shrimp (Metapenaeus dobsonii).

Boat race

Kumarakom has a wide variety of houseboats and is well known throughout the world for houseboat experience. They are used only for tourists these days. A separate boat known as kettuvallam is used by the people to go fishing or to transport goods. Apart from these, there are elegant special boats like Kochu-odi Vallam, Odi-Vallam, Iruttukutthi Vallam, Churulan Vallam and Chundan Vallam, which take part in the boat races around Onam time, including the Nehru Trophy boat race Alappuzha. There is a private sailing club in Kumarakom, located on the shore of the Vembanad lake.

Modes of access

One can access Kumarakom by many means:
By rail: via Kottayam
By road:KSRTC(10 kilometres) Buses and taxis are easily available at all times of the day from Kottayam.
By boat: Public ferry by SWTD (Govt. of Kerala) to and from Muhamma (near Alappuzha) to Kumarakom Jetty. Once can avail a public ferry and return to same spot in about 1.5 hours at cheap rate of Rs 20 on Kumarakom-Muhamma—Kumarakom route (across Vempanad lake). Also one can choose Cheepunkal-Maniaparambu-Cheepunkal to see Kuttanad like topography, agriculture, life along the river. 
Ferry Timings:

Tourism sightseeing

Tourism in Kumarakom largely revolves -around the backwaters of the Vembanad Lake. Several luxury and budget resorts lined up on the shores of the lake provide tourists with facilities for boating, yachting and fishing, with panoramic views of the lake. The other major attraction is the Bird Sanctuary, which is open from 6 am to 6 pm and can be visited by canoes arranged by local fishermen at the entrance to the sanctuary. A two-hour rowing canoe trip is quite cheap, and is best undertaken in the evening or early morning to avoid the afternoon sun.

Furthermore, the Aruvikkuzhi Waterfall and its surrounding rubber plantation are a photographer's delight. There is also the Bay Island Drift Museum near the Kumarakom beach for  history lovers, open from 10 am – 5 pm on Tuesdays – Saturdays and from 11.30 am – 5 pm on Sundays.

Kumarakom is the first destination in  India to Implement Responsible Tourism practices. Kerala Tourism was awarded for its path-breaking 'Responsible Tourism' project in Kumarakom, which has successfully linked the local community with the hospitality industry and government departments, thereby creating a model for empowerment and development of the people in the area while sustaining eco-friendly tourism.

Vivanta By Taj
Earlier Taj Garden Retreat, now Vivanta By Taj, the first modern tourist resort in Kumarakom was established in the Victorian two storeyed bungalow built by Alfred George Baker in the year 1881 on huge pieces of teak wood rafters packed in mud as a base. This house on the lake at Kumarakom was the house of four generations of the Baker family, for over a hundred years. The bird Sanctuary and the two storeyed bungalow built by Mr.A G Baker on the muddy land are places of interest for tourists from all over the world. The bungalow still remains grand but silent reminder of an age and people whose hard work cannot be erased by time.

Schools nearby
Sree Kumaramangalam Public School, Kumarakom
Sree Kumaramangalam Higher Secondary School
Government Higher Secondary School
Govt U P School Pandan Bazar Kumarakom
St. Mary's LP school
Maria Bhavan School
Sacred Heart L.P School
SB LP School
Anie Baker memorial U P school Kavanatinkara

In popular culture
Arundhati Roy's The God of Small Things is set in Ayemenem or Aymanam village, which adjoins Kumarakom. The explosive success of this novel has given some added tourism impetus to this area.  The Taj Garden Retreat hotel complex is centered on a building that is called "History House" in the novel; it was built by British missionary Alfred George Baker, whom the locals called "Kari Saipu" (possibly an elided form of "Baker Sahib"), as in the novel. Four generations of Bakers lived in the house until 1962, speaking Malayalam, and even wearing the mundu. The Baker Memorial School, Kottayam, was started by a daughter of this family in 1925.  The Baker family's house is in ruins in the novel, as it was in reality before was developed into a hotel and has been restored by the Taj group. The Ayemenem house, where Arundhati Roy spent part of her childhood (like the twins in the story), can also be visited in the village, which can be reached by boat along the Meenachil river that figures prominently in the story.

Special tourism zone
Kumarakom has been declared a special tourism zone by the Kerala state government, as legislated for by Kerala Tourism Act, 2005. Development in the area is therefore now controlled by the guidelines written by the STZ committee, and published at http://www.keralatourism.org/specialtourism.php

Awards and honours

It had won top honours including the UNWTO Ulysses Award  for Innovation in Public Policy and Governance. The Kumarakom initiative had earlier won the National Award for Best Responsible Tourism Project and also the PATA Grand Award for Environment.

References

External links

Kumarakom - Kerala Tourism

Villages in Kottayam district
Mangroves